An eco-tariff, also known as an environmental tariff or carbon tariff, is a trade barrier erected for the purpose of reducing pollution and improving the environment. These trade barriers may take the form of import or export taxes on products that have a large carbon footprint or are imported from countries with lax environmental regulations. The proposed EU Carbon Border Adjustment Mechanism would be a carbon tariff.

International trade vs. environmental degradation 

There has been debate on the role that increased international trade has played in increasing pollution.  While some maintain that increases in pollution which result in both local environmental degradation and a global tragedy of the commons are intimately linked to increases in international trade, others have argued that as citizens become more affluent they'll also advocate for cleaner environments.   According to a World Bank paper:Since freer trade raises income, it directly contributes to increasing pollution levels via the scale effect.  However, it thereby induces the composition (and) technique effects of increased income, both of which tend to reduce pollution levels.Dean, Judith M & Lovely, Mary E (2008), Trade Growth, Production Fragmentation, and China's Environment, Pgs. 3 & 5, National Bureau of Economic Research, Working Paper 13860, Cambridge, MA [2]Proponents of environmental tariff implementation have highlighted that if implemented correctly, the tariff could serve to stop strategic behavior of foreign nations and return efficient economic policy in the foreign country. Additionally, environmental standards will be harmonized between the trading nations as a result of the environmental tariff.

One of the major issues that are raised when discussing environmental tariffs, is the issue of a reduction in trade. The argument raised is that tariffs reduce trade and may not actually be targeting the actual source of the pollution. They argue that pollution is not just as a result of imported goods but a large part of pollution suffered occurs within the borders of a country, therefore trade would merely harming trade without actually addressing the root cause effectively.

Early tariff implementation proposal 
Although the United States has in the past been accused of dragging its feet on implementing tough new anti-pollution measures, it was the originator of a legislative proposal suggesting an environmental tariff be applied against exporting countries whose exports gained significant cost advantages due to less stringent environmental regulations.  The proposed legislation was tabled as the International Pollution Deterrence Act of 1991 and was introduced in its Senate in April of that year.

Doha Ministerial Declaration 
Negotiations took place in 2001 Doha, Qatar, towards the improvement of work related issues concerning the implementation of present agreements. This was a mandated conference dubbed the Fourth Ministerial Conference. One of the issues discussed concerned the issues of trade barriers on environmental goods and services. The result of which was ministers agreeing to a reduction or complete removal of tariff and non-tariff barriers to environmental goods and services such as catalytic converters and air filters to name a few.

Proposed International Pollution Control Index 
A notable feature of the proposed U.S. International Pollution Deterrence Act was the international pollution control index it cited within its Section 5, which read:INTERNATIONAL POLLUTION CONTROL INDEXSection 8002 of the Solid Waste Disposal Act (42 U.S.C. 6982) is amended by adding the following new subsections at the end thereof:
 `(t) The Administrator shall prepare, within one hundred and twenty days of the enactment of this section and yearly thereafter, a pollution control index for each of the top fifty countries identified by the Office of Trade and Investment of the Department of Commerce based on the value of exports to the United States from that country's attainment of pollution control standards in the areas of air, water, hazardous waste and solid waste as compared to the United States. The purpose of this index is to measure the level of compliance within each country with standards comparable to or greater than those in the United States. The Administrator shall analyze, in particular, the level of technology employed and actual costs incurred for pollution control in the major export sectors of each country in formulating the index.

Implementation problems and resistance 
Environmental tariffs may result in the movement in production of goods to areas in which stricter environmental standards are enforced. Environment tariffs were not implemented in the past, in part, because they were not sanctioned by multilateral trade regimes such as the World Trade Organization (WTO) and within the General Agreement on Tariffs and Trade (GATT), a fact which generated considerable criticism and calls for reform.

Moreover, the GATT does condone the use of tariffs as market interventions, so long as the interventions do not discriminate products, both foreign and domestic. A disputed case relating to this policy was brought forth to the GATT/WTO, involving the U.S. and Canada over Canadian environmental regulations on beverage containers.

Additionally, many foreign factory owners in newly industrialized countries and underdeveloped countries saw the attempts to impose pollution controls on them as suspicious...
 "...seeing it as a threat to their growth and fearing that developed countries would attempt to export their preferences for pollution control or to place 'environmental' tariffs on imports from countries with lower standards."
Moreover, the problem of what the ideal tariff level is also a cause for concern when implementing environmental tariffs.

Further implementation problems have been as a result of what some developing nations may view as green protectionism. Green protectionism being the use of methods meant to address legitimate environment goals for the end goal of protection.

See also 
 American Clean Energy and Security Act
 Carbon fee and dividend
 Ecotax
 Environmental economics
 
 Green politics

References

Further reading 
 International Trade and Climate Change: Economic, Legal, and Institutional Perspectives, World Bank Publications, 2007, [1];
 Mani, Muthukumara S., 1966, Environmental Tariffs on Polluting Imports: An Empirical Study, Environmental & Resource Economics, European Association of Environmental and Resource Economists, Volume 7 Issue 4 (June 1996), Pgs. 391–411;
 Jean-Marie, Grether & Mathys, Nicole A. & Jaime, de Melo, 2006, Unraveling the World-Wide Pollution Haven Effect, Universite de Lausanne, Ecole des HEC, DEEP - Cahiers de Recherches Economiques du Département d'Econometrie et d'Economie politique (DEEP);
 Robison, David H., 1988, Industrial Pollution Abatement: The Impact on Balance of Trad, Canadian Journal of Economics, Canadian Economics Association, Vol. 21, Pgs. 187–99, February;
 Ghosh, S. & Yamarik, Steven 2006, Do Regional Trading Arrangements Harm the Environment?: An Analysis of 162 Countries in 1990, Applied Econometric and International Development, 2006 Vol. 6;
 Naghavi, Alireza, Can R&D-Inducing Green Tariffs Replace International Environmental Regulations?; Fondazione Eni Enrico Mattei, 2006–92;
 Tobey, James A, 1990, The Effects of Domestic Environmental Policies on Patterns of World Trade: An Empirical Test, Kyklos, Blackwell Publishing, Vol. 43(2), Pgs. 191–209;
 Baldwin, R E & Murray, Tracy, 1977, MFN Tariff Reductions and Developing Country Trade Benefits under the GSP, Economic Journal, Royal Economic Society, Vol. 87 (345), pages 30–46, March 1977
 Hazilla, Michael & Kopp, Raymond J, 1990, Social Cost of Environmental Quality Regulations: A General Equilibrium Analysis, Journal of Political Economy, University of Chicago Press, Vol. 98(4), Pgs. 853–73, August 1990;

Environmental tax
Environmental law
International taxation
Commercial policy
Protectionism
European Green Deal